Kateryna Kozlova was the defending champion, but chose to participate at the 2018 Wimbledon Championships instead.

Dayana Yastremska won the title, defeating Anastasia Potapova in the final, 6–1, 6–0.

Seeds

Draw

Finals

Top half

Bottom half

References
Main Draw

Torneo Internazionale Femminile Antico Tiro a Volo - Singles